USS LST-69 was a  in the United States Navy during World War II.

Construction and career 
LST-69 was laid down on 7 September 1942 at Jeffersonville Boat and Machine Co., Jeffersonville, Indiana. Launched on 28 August 1943 and commissioned on 6 October 1943.

During World War II, LST-69 was assigned to the Asiatic-Pacific theater. She took part in the Gilbert Islands operations from 13 November to 8 December 1943.

She was destroyed and sunk during the West Loch disaster alongside 5 other LSTs at Pearl Harbor on 21 May 1944. On that day, she was moored with LST-205, LST-225, LST-274, LST-43, LST-179, LST-353, and LST-39. No crew members were lost aboard the ship during that disaster.

LST-69 was struck from the Navy Register on 18 July 1944.

Awards 
LST-69 have earned the following awards:

American Campaign Medal
Asiatic-Pacific Campaign Medal (1 battle star)
World War II Victory Medal

Citations

Sources 
 
 
 
 

World War II amphibious warfare vessels of the United States
Ships built in Jeffersonville, Indiana
1943 ships
LST-1-class tank landing ships of the United States Navy
Ships sunk by non-combat internal explosions
Maritime incidents in May 1944